Banzai: Death Sortie of the Yamato is a 1991 video game published by General Quarters Software.

Gameplay
Banzai: Death Sortie of the Yamato is a game in which the Japanese battleship Yamato tries to reach Okinawa while successfully escaping detection from the Allied naval forces.

Reception
H. E. Dille reviewed the game for Computer Gaming World, and stated that "Since this particular designer has provided hours of enjoyment in the past, one can only hope his next effort does not require such a Sisyphus-like effort in terms of play balance."

Reviews
Fire & Movement #76

References

1991 video games
Computer wargames
Japan in non-Japanese culture
Naval video games
Pacific War video games
Turn-based strategy video games
Video games developed in the United States
Video games set in Okinawa Prefecture